Upper Burnie is a residential locality in the local government area (LGA) of Burnie in the North-west and west LGA region of Tasmania. The 2016 census recorded a population of 1821 for the state suburb of Upper Burnie.
It is a suburb of Burnie in north-west Tasmania. It is situated on the hill above Burnie accessed via Mount Street.

There is a Woolworths Supermarket and the Top of the Town Hotel Motel.

History 
Upper Burnie was gazetted as a locality in 1966.

Geography
Alexander Creek forms part of the eastern boundary.

Road infrastructure
Route B18 (Mount Street) runs through from north-west to south-east.

Education 
The Upper Burnie Primary School existed up until 2009 until it was merged with Acton and Brooklyn Primary Schools and a new school was built on the grounds of the Parklands High School.

Sports 
The Burnie Sports Centre hosts:

Basketball
Badminton
Mixed martial arts
Rugby – Burnie Rugby Union Club

References

External links 
Top of the Town Hotel Motel
Burnie Sports Centre

Suburbs of Burnie, Tasmania